Transportation in Guatemala includes roads, waterways, and airports.  It formerly included railways.

Ground transportation
Chicken buses, recycled and often colorfully painted former US school buses, are popular within cities and for short-distance trips. There are a number of Guatemalan bus and van transport companies that most travelers use to get from the airport in Guatemala City to Antigua, Lake Atitlan in the Western Highlands of Guatemala and Monterrico on the Pacific coast.

Some first class bus operators (such as Litegua between Guatemala City and Puerto Barrios, Fuente del Norte between Guatemala City and Flores, and Monja Blanca to Cobán) run safe, modern air-conditioned buses for longer distances. In some parts of Guatemala City passengers on public buses are vulnerable to crime therefore it is not a good idea to take public buses in Guatemala City nor chicken buses from Guatemala City to other destinations. Shuttles and taxis (often tuk-tuks)are the better option. There are no passenger trains.

Streets
Guatemalan streets tend to be one-ways to ease congestion and move traffic.

Highways
Total: 14,095 km
Paved: 4,863 km (including 75 km of expressways)
Unpaved: 9,232 km (1999 est.)

Railways

total:
  operated by the Railroad Development Corporation until September 2007, now closed 
  closed

narrow gauge:
884 km  gauge (single track)

Railway links with adjacent countries
  Mexico - currently closed (since 1996 or before) - break-of-gauge /
  Belize - None
  Honduras - none in use - break-of-gauge / (?)
  El Salvador - currently closed

Waterways
260 km navigable year round; additional 730 km navigable during high-water season

Pipelines
 oil 480 km

Ports and harbors

Atlantic Ocean
 Puerto Barrios
 Santo Tomás de Castilla

Pacific Ocean
 Champerico, Puerto Quetzal, Puerto San José

Merchant marine
None (1999 est.)

Boats
Ferries are available in certain regions, such as Sayaxché or around Livingston. The best way to get to the various Mayan villages around Lake Atitlan is on one of the ubiquitous "shark" boats.

Airports

450 (2006 est.)

Named airports
La Aurora International Airport
Mundo Maya International Airport
San José Airport
Quetzaltenango Airport
Puerto Barrios Airport

Airports - with paved runways
total: 11
2,438 to 3,047 m: 3
1,524 to 2,437 m: 2
914 to 1,523 m: 4
under 914 m: 2 (2006 est.)

Airports - with unpaved runways
total: 439
2,438 to 3,047 m: 1
1,524 to 2,437 m: 8
914 to 1,523 m: 111
under 914 m: 319 (2006 est.)

See also 
 Guatemala

References

External links